Herbert Young (4 September 1899 – 1 May 1976) was an English professional footballer who made over 260 appearances as an outside left in the Football League for Aberdare Athletic, Brentford, Newport County, Queens Park Rangers, Bristol Rovers and Swindon Town.

Playing career 
An outside left, Young began his career at First Division club Everton, before dropping down to the Third Division South to sign for Aberdare Athletic in 1923. He moved to Third Division South strugglers Brentford in February 1925 and later moved to Wales to play for Bangor City and Newport County, before returning to London to join Third Division South club Queens Park Rangers in June 1929. He finished his career with spells at Bristol Rovers and Swindon Town.

Career statistics

References

1899 births
Footballers from Liverpool
English footballers
Brentford F.C. players
English Football League players
Queens Park Rangers F.C. players
Everton F.C. players
Association football outside forwards
Aberdare Athletic F.C. players
Bangor City F.C. players
Newport County A.F.C. players
Bristol Rovers F.C. players
Swindon Town F.C. players
1976 deaths